The RCAF Blackouts were a Canadian World War II entertainment group that performed at airbases in Canada and internationally.

References

United Kingdom home front during World War II